The National Lipid Association (NLA) is an American non-profit multidisciplinary medical society that aims to enhance the practice of lipid management in clinical medicine. The NLA focuses on the prevention of cardiovascular disease and other lipid-related disorders.

Overview

The National Lipid Association was formed in 1997 and has over 2,000 members. It provides medical education for healthcare professionals and physicians to advance knowledge and certification in clinical lipidology. Joseph Saseen is the current president of NLA. In 2014, the NLA proposed a working definition of statin intolerance and made general recommendations for health professionals.

The NLA publishes the Journal of Clinical Lipidology.

Scientific statements

In 2019, the NLA's Nutrition and Lifestyle Task Force published a scientific statement based on a comprehensive review of recent clinical evidence on the effects of low and very-low-carbohydrate diets on the management of body weight and other cardiometabolic risk factors. The statement concluded that low and very-low-carbohydrate die are not superior to other dietary approaches for weight loss and are difficult to maintain in the long term.

In 2021, the NLA published a scientific statement on lipid measurements in the management of cardiovascular diseases.

In 2022, the NLA published an official scientific statement on statin intolerance, updating the definition which now classifies statin intolerance as either partial or complete. The 2022 statement recommends different strategies to help patients stay on statin medications, and alternative medications to those who cannot tolerate statins.

Selected publications

References

External links
National Lipid Association

Medical associations based in the United States
Professional associations based in the United States